Tomás Wade (date of birth unknown, died 7 March 1982) was an Argentine field hockey player. He competed in the men's tournament at the 1948 Summer Olympics.

References

External links
 

Year of birth missing
1982 deaths
Argentine male field hockey players
Olympic field hockey players of Argentina
Field hockey players at the 1948 Summer Olympics
Sportspeople from Córdoba Province, Argentina